The Dallas International Motor Speedway was a racetrack located in Lewisville, Texas.  It operated from June 1969 to 1973. The racetrack served as the site for such events as the NHRA Spring Nationals and World Finals, and the Texas International Pop Festival in 1969.

When it first opened, the Speedway featured a quarter-mile paved dragstrip, grandstands, and a distinctive control and observation tower. Later, a 2.5-mile road course was added, followed by a quarter-mile dirt course for motorcycle racing.

The first event held at the Speedway was the 1969 NHRA Spring Nationals. The event was generally considered to be a successful debut for the new track, but was marred by tragedy when Funny Car driver Gerry Schwartz was killed in a mid-track collision with Pat Foster.

The track was also the site of another tragedy on Oct. 16, 1971 when race car driver Art Arfons crashed his jet-powered "Super Cyclops" resulting in the deaths of two onlookers and a passenger in the vehicle, WFAA TV news reporter Gene Thomas.

A series of event rainouts, debt issues, and track maintenance costs combined to force the Speedway into bankruptcy by 1973, when the property was purchased for commercial development and the Speedway facilities were demolished. No trace of the Speedway remains at the site today. The track was located east of I-35E at what is now approximately mile marker 448 (Round Grove Rd./Hebron Parkway exit). The Speedway tower was near the present-day intersection of Waters Ridge Dr. and Lake Pointe Dr.

References

External links
 http://www.na-motorsports.com/Tracks/TX/DIMS.html
 http://www.dragzine.com/news/flashback-friday-dallas-international-motor-speedway/
 http://www.cityoflewisville.com/index.aspx?page=896

Motorsport venues in Texas
Sports venues in Dallas